The Women's 800m Freestyle event at the 2003 Pan American Games took place on August 16, 2003 (Day 15 of the Games).

At this race, Kristel Köbrich won the first medal of her country in swimming at Pan American Games at all times.

Medalists

Records

Results

References

2003 Pan American Games Results: Day 15, CBC online; retrieved 2009-06-13.
usaswimming

Freestyle, 800m
2003 in women's swimming
Swim